The list of International Labour Organization Conventions contains 190 codifications of world wide labour standards. International Labour Organization (ILO) Conventions are developed through tripartite negotiations between member state representatives from trade unions, employers' organisations and governments, and adopted by the annual International Labour Conference (ILC). Member state governments subsequently ratify Conventions and incorporate their provisions into national legislation.   

The first Convention was adopted in 1919 and covers hours of work,  Convention, adopted in 2019, covers violence and harassment in the world of work.  The Declaration on Fundamental Principles and Rights at Work, adopted by the member states in 1998, identified eight fundamental Conventions as binding on all members; four prohibit forced labour and child labour, and four provide rights to organize, to collectively bargain, to equal pay and to freedom from discrimination at work. There are also important Recommendations, which are widely adopted as standards, but do not have the same binding effect as Conventions, such as the Employment Relationship Recommendation, 2006 (No. 198) that ensures universal protection of workers for rights, and requires clear identification in national law for the employer, state or other party responsible for the right.

The ILO monitors the application of the Conventions and makes observations regarding member state compliance, however, there are no enforcement mechanisms within the ILO for non-compliance or breaches of the Conventions.  The enforcement of Conventions depends on the jurisprudence of courts recognized by the respective member states.

Classification of the Conventions

The ILO classifies Conventions by type, subject and status.  

 Type relates to whether the Convention is fundamental, covers governance matters or is technical (generally issues of working conditions). 
 Subjects covered by the Conventions:
 Individual rights at work, mainly on safety, wage standards, working time, or social security, and the rights to freedom from forced to work or work during childhood. 
 Collective labour rights to participation in the workplace, particularly to join a trade union, collectively bargain and take strike action, as well as direct representation within the management of organizations. 
 Rights to equal treatment, that are referential to the terms and conditions of people in comparable situations, with special protections for indigenous communities and migrants. 
 Promotion of job security, through standards for dismissals, protection upon an employer's insolvency, regulation of employment agencies and requirements upon member states to promote full and fulfilling employment. 
 Requirements for administrative apparatus by governments to enforce and promote labour standards, through inspections, the collection of statistics, training and consulting with unions and employers before the passage of legislation. 
 Sectoral Conventions specific to certain industries, these include seafaring, fishing, plantations, hotels, nursing, home and domestic work, where employees may be particularly vulnerable.
 Status relates to whether a Convention is up to date, requires revision or has been abrogated (withdrawn).

List of the Conventions

Recommendations
As well as Conventions, the ILO also produces Recommendations, which are widely adopted as standards. These do not necessarily have the same binding effect as Conventions, nor require a ratification and monitoring process, but are nevertheless widely followed. A key norm is the Employment Relationship Recommendation, 2006 (No. 198) that ensures universal protection of workers for rights, and requires clear identification in national law for the employer, state or other party responsible for the right.

See also
Declaration of Philadelphia 1944
Declaration on Fundamental Principles and Rights at Work 1998
International labour law
European labour law
UK labour law
US labor law

Notes

References

External links
Conventions on the ILO webpage

International relations lists
List
ILO